Santa Cruz da Esperança is a municipality in the state of São Paulo in Brazil. The population is 2,153 (2020 est.) in an area of 148 km². The elevation is 612 m.

References

Municipalities in São Paulo (state)